The Coimbra University Stadium (Portuguese: Estádio Universitário de Coimbra), or EUC, is an extensive sports complex of the University of Coimbra on Mondego's left bank, in Santa Clara parish, in the city of Coimbra, Portugal. The stadium was opened in 1963.

It has 2 football (soccer) fields, one of them with an athletics track, a rugby union field, gymnasiums, tennis courts, a Radio-Controlled car track, and two multisports pavilions for play indoor sports such as basketball, handball, rink hockey, and volleyball. 

The Faculdade de Ciências do Desporto e Educação Física da Universidade de Coimbra, the sports sciences faculty of the University of Coimbra, is located there, and includes library and restaurant for the student community.

See also
Associação Académica de Coimbra
University of Coimbra

References

External links
Official website

Buildings and structures in Coimbra
Sport in Coimbra
University of Coimbra
Sports venues in Coimbra District
1963 establishments in Portugal
Sports venues completed in 1963